Summerside is a census-designated place (CDP) in Union Township, Clermont County, Ohio, United States. Its population was 5,083 as of the 2010 census.

History
Originally known as "East Mount Carmel", the name of the community was changed around the time a post office was established in August 1887.

Geography
Summerside is located in western Clermont County at  (39.117261, -84.290728), in the western part of Union Township. It is bordered to the south by Mount Carmel. Ohio State Route 32 forms part of the southern boundary of the CDP, and Interstate 275 forms the eastern boundary, with access to Summerside from Exit 63, where it intersects Route 32.

Demographics

As of the census of 2000, there were 5,523 people, 2,195 households, and 1,536 families residing in the CDP. The population density was 2,425.2 people per square mile (935.3/km2). There were 2,277 housing units at an average density of 999.9/sq mi (385.6/km2). The racial makeup of the CDP was 96.13% White, 1.14% African American, 0.25% Native American, 1.01% Asian, 0.45% from other races, and 1.01% from two or more races. Hispanic or Latino of any race were 1.10% of the population.

There were 2,195 households, out of which 36.7% had children under the age of 18 living with them, 53.8% were married couples living together, 12.9% had a female householder with no husband present, and 30.0% were non-families. 24.6% of all households were made up of individuals, and 6.2% had someone living alone who was 65 years of age or older. The average household size was 2.52 and the average family size was 3.02.

In the CDP the population was spread out, with 26.8% under the age of 18, 9.1% from 18 to 24, 34.4% from 25 to 44, 21.0% from 45 to 64, and 8.7% who were 65 years of age or older. The median age was 32 years. For every 100 females there were 91.8 males. For every 100 females age 18 and over, there were 86.6 males.

The median income for a household in the CDP was $43,138, and the median income for a family was $51,662. Males had a median income of $40,335 versus $26,220 for females. The per capita income for the CDP was $20,190. About 4.3% of families and 6.2% of the population were below the poverty line, including 7.8% of those under age 18 and 6.0% of those age 65 or over.

References

Census-designated places in Clermont County, Ohio